Slivnik is a village in the municipality of Veles, North Macedonia.

Demographics
Slivnik has traditionally and exclusively been inhabited by Muslim Albanians. Some Muslim Albanians migrated from Slivnik during the twentieth century with Muslim Albanians from Gorno Jabolčište and Dolno Jabolčište replacing them. From 1955 onward, some Bosniaks also settled in the village.

According to the 2002 census, the village had a total of 444 inhabitants. Ethnic groups in the village include:

Albanians 443
Others 1

References

External links

Villages in Veles Municipality
Albanian communities in North Macedonia